The Rice Family Cemetery is a historic cemetery at the junction of United States Route 65 and Arkansas Highway 388 in rural Varner, Arkansas.  The small cemetery is the burial site of Robert R. Rice, one of the early settlers of Varner and a prominent race horse enthusiast.  The cemetery contains seventeen graves, eleven of which are marked, dating from 1870 to 1965.  In addition to members of the Rice family, it also holds graves of the Varner and Douglas families, also associated with the area's early history.

The cemetery was listed on the National Register of Historic Places in 2003.

See also
National Register of Historic Places listings in Lincoln County, Arkansas

References

Cemeteries on the National Register of Historic Places in Arkansas
1870 establishments in Arkansas
National Register of Historic Places in Lincoln County, Arkansas
Cultural infrastructure completed in 1870
Cemeteries established in the 1870s